SFDK may refer to:

 Six Flags Discovery Kingdom, an amusement park located in California
 SFDK (band), a Spanish hip-hop group